Raul Germano Brandão (12 March 1867, in Foz do Douro, Porto – 5 December 1930, in Lisbon) was a Portuguese writer, journalist and military officer, notable for the realism of his literary descriptions and by the lyricism of his language. Brandão was born in Foz do Douro, a parish of Porto, where he spent the majority of his youth. Born in a family of sailors, the ocean and the sailors are recurring themes in his work.

Biography
Brandão completed his secondary studies in 1891. After that, he joined the military academy, where he initiated a long career in the Ministry of War. While working in the ministry, he also worked as a journalist and published several books.

In 1896, Brandão was commissioned in Guimarães, where he would meet his future wife. He married in the next year and settled in the city. Despite living in Guimarães, Brandão spent long periods in Lisbon. After retiring from the army, in 1912, Brandão initiated the most productive period of his writing career. He died on 5 December 1930, age 63, after a lifetime of writing and publishing.

Published works

1890 - Impressões e Paisagens
1896 - História de um Palhaço
1901 - O Padre
1903 - A Farsa
1906 - Os Pobres (The Poor, trans. Karen Sotelino. Dalkey Archive Press, 2016)
1912 - El-Rei Junot
1914 - A Conspiração de 1817
1917 - Húmus (1917)
1919 - Memórias (vol. I)
1923 - Teatro
1923 - Os Pescadores
1925 - Memórias (vol. II)
1926 - As Ilhas Desconhecidas
1926 - A Morte do Palhaço e o Mistério da Árvore
1927 - Jesus Cristo em Lisboa, with Teixeira de Pascoaes
1929 - O Avejão
1930 - Portugal Pequenino, with Maria Angelina Brandão
1931 - O Pobre de Pedir
1933 - Vale de Josafat

References 
 Yahoo.com Encyclopedia

External links
 
 

1867 births
1930 deaths
Portuguese male writers
Portuguese journalists
Male journalists
Portuguese military officers
University of Porto alumni
People from Porto
19th-century Portuguese writers
19th-century male writers
Symbolist writers
Portuguese republicans